"Kaze no Lonely Way" (Japanese: 風のLonely Way) is the fifth single by Kiyotaka Sugiyama, released by VAP and Embark on January 13, 1988. The single reached #1 on the Oricon Singles Chart for 1987, giving Sugiyama his third #1 spot since "Shade," released a year prior.

Background 
The song was used as the sixth generation ending theme of the TV series Tuesday Suspense Theatre. In addition to the song ending in the program, the instrumental version was played on the screen at the end of the program.

It ranked in the TBS television series "The Best Ten" on January 28, 1988, and made a live appearance on this program for the first time in about a year since "Saigo no Holy Night" in 1987. It was on "The Top Ten" of 6 weeks in a row, the highest ranking second place (the same year February 4 recorded (during this time of first place a-second 517 times) Hikaru Genji's "Glass no Jūdai" and Akina Nakamori's "Al-Mauj"). At the time of this program rank-in, those songs of the title moderator, Kenji Matsushita to "the wind in there was to have been" and also wrong call twice.

Track listing

Charts

Weekly charts

Year-end charts

References 

1988 songs
Oricon Weekly number-one singles
1988 singles
Japanese pop songs